Football at the 2019 African Games was played in Rabat, Morocco between 16–30 August 2019.

Two tournaments were held: the men's tournament and the women's tournament.

Medal summary

Results

References
 Results

 
2019
2019 African Games
African Games
2019 African Games
2019 in women's association football